XEFZ-AM is a radio station on 660 AM in Monterrey, Nuevo León. It is owned by Grupo Radio Alegría and carries a sports talk format known as ABC Deportes.

History
XEFZ received its concession on March 29, 1971. It operated on 1110 kHz as a 250-watt daytimer. Not long after, XEFZ moved to 660 and ramped up its power to 10,000 watts.

On January 4, 2021, XEFZ switched from news/talk "ABC Noticias" to sports talk "ABC Deportes". At the same time, XHGBO-FM 92.1 was switched to simulcasting the new sports talk format from carrying sister station XEBJB-AM 570.

References

Mass media in Monterrey
Sports radio stations in Mexico